The first season of the American serial drama television series Friday Night Lights commenced airing in the United States and Canada on October 3, 2006 and concluded its 22-episode season on April 11, 2007 on NBC. The series revolves around the Dillon Panthers and their new head coach Eric Taylor as they deal with the pressure of high school football in Texas and everything that comes with it, on and off the field.

The first 10 episodes aired Tuesdays at 8:00 pm in the United States. When the show returned from the Christmas hiatus, it aired Wednesdays at 8:00 pm for the rest of its season. The season was released on DVD as a five disc boxed set on August 28, 2007, in the United States and Canada, and October 29, 2007, in the United Kingdom.

Crew
The season was produced by NBC Universal Television, Imagine Television, and Film 44 and was aired on NBC in the United States. The executive producers were developer Peter Berg, Sarah Aubrey, David Nevins, Brian Grazer, and Jason Katims, with Jeffrey Reiner, and John Cameron serving as co-executive producers. Writers included Berg, Katims, producers David Hudgins and Bridget Carpenter, consulting producers Kerry Ehrin, Patrick Massett, and John Zinman, supervising producers Carter Harris and Elizabeth Heldens, and Andy Miller and Aaron Rahsaan Thomas. Katims served as showrunner. Regular directors throughout the season include Reiner, Allison Liddi-Brown, Stephen Kay, and David Boyd. Theme song music was composed by W. G. Snuffy Walden. Songs from Explosions in the Sky were also used throughout the season.

Cast

In the initial season, 10 major roles received star billing in the opening credits. Kyle Chandler portrayed Eric Taylor, new head coach of the Dillon Panthers. Connie Britton played Tami Taylor, wife of Eric's and new guidance counselor at Dillon High School. Gaius Charles played Brian "Smash" Williams, the cocky running back and star of the team. Zach Gilford played second-string quarterback Matt Saracen. Minka Kelly played Lyla Garrity, head cheerleader and girlfriend of the first-string quarterback Jason Street, played by Scott Porter. Taylor Kitsch portrayed Tim Riggins, fullback, resident bad boy, and best friend of Street's. Adrianne Palicki played Riggins' girlfriend and resident bad girl Tyra Collette. Jesse Plemons played Landry Clarke, Saracen's best friend. Aimee Teegarden played Julie Taylor, daughter of Eric and Tami's.

Supporting characters given expanded appearances throughout the season include: Brad Leland as Lyla's father and head of the Dillon Panthers' Booster Club Buddy Garrity, Derek Phillips as Tim's brother Billy Riggins, Louanne Stephens as Saracen's grandmother Lorraine Saracen, Liz Mikel as Smash's mother Corrina Williams, Kevin Rankin as Herc, and Jae Head as Bo Miller.

Fictional game results

 The game, won by Dillon 22-21 on the field, was subsequently forfeited because quarterback "Voodoo" Tatum was ruled ineligible for not having satisfied residency requirements.
 Final score not revealed, though a TV newscast indicates the game was a lopsided win with Brian "Smash" Williams scoring 3 touchdowns.
 Final score not shown, but Dillon scored a touchdown with about five minutes left in scoreless game.
 The referees at Dunston were allowing the home team to commit infractions such as facemasks, late hits, and pass interference without penalties.  When Dillon scored in the fourth quarter to take a commanding 40–24 lead, a Cardinal hit Smash after he scored the touchdown, again with no penalty call. Riggins rushed to Smash's defense, and a melee ensued before the extra point could be attempted. The game was called at that point, and Dillon was awarded the victory.
 The game was played at a makeshift field due to a toxic train car derailment.

Episodes

Reception

Critical response
On Rotten Tomatoes, the season has an approval rating of 94% with an average score of 8.2 out of 10 based on 31 reviews. The website's critical consensus reads, "Innovative for its time, Friday Night Lights offers a realistic glimpse into small-town life and the social issues that accompany it." On the review aggregator website Metacritic, the first season scored 78 out of 100, based on 32 reviews, indicating "Generally favorable reviews".

Several critics lauded the series: Virginia Hefferna of The New York Times called it "A fiercely controlled and inventive work of art"; Troy Patterson of Slate named it "The most engrossing new drama of the fall season"; and Tom Shales of The Washington Post said it is "Extraordinary in just about every conceivable way". Robert Bianco of USA Today praised the series' "rare ability to portray life in small-town America without being condescending or sentimental", and Henry Goldblatt of Entertainment Weekly applauded the series' cinematography, setting, and subject matter, saying: "Lights doesn't look a whole lot like anything else on television right now."

Accolades
For the 59th Primetime Emmy Awards, Peter Berg was nominated for Outstanding Directing for a Drama Series for "Pilot" and the series won for Outstanding Casting for a Drama Series. For the 23rd TCA Awards, the series won for Outstanding New Program of the Year and received nominations for Outstanding Achievement in Drama, Program of the Year, and Individual Achievement in Drama (Connie Britton and Kyle Chandler).

References

External links
 Friday Night Lights – list of episodes at NBC
 

 
2006 American television seasons
2007 American television seasons